Karl Henrik Brink (born 12 August 1975) is a Swedish professional golfer who has  played on the European Tour and the Challenge Tour.

Brink was born in Helsingborg, Sweden. His sister, Maria, is also a professional golfer, who has competed on the Ladies European Tour.

In 1993, Brink was member of the Swedish team winning the European Boys' Team Championship in Ascona, Switzerland. He also represented Sweden at the 1994 Espirito Santo Trophy at Le Golf National, outside Paris, France, earning a bronze medal with his team.

Brink turned professional in 1994. He has three wins on Europe's second tier Challenge Tour, the first coming in 1997 at the BTC Slovenian Open, when he went on to finish the season in second place on the 1997 Challenge Tour money list. His second win was at the 1999 Öhrlings Swedish Matchplay, were he beat Henrik Stenson in the final. His third win came in 2006 at the Lexus Open. He has also had the opportunity to play in events on the European Tour most years, but has only had one full season at the top level, in 1998 following his graduation from the Challenge Tour.

Professional wins (4)

Challenge Tour wins (3)

Other wins (1)
2000 Flommen Open (Swedish mini-tour)

Team appearances
Amateur
Jacques Léglise Trophy (representing the Continent of Europe): 1993
European Boys' Team Championship (representing Sweden): 1993 (winners)
Eisenhower Trophy (representing Sweden): 1994
St Andrews Trophy (representing the Continent of Europe): 1994

References

External links

Kalle Brink – profile at golfdata.se

Swedish male golfers
European Tour golfers
1975 births
Living people
Sportspeople from Helsingborg